John Albertson was an American baseball third baseman and shortstop in the Negro leagues. He played with the Brooklyn Royal Giants in 1936 and the New York Black Yankees in 1937.

References

External links
 and Seamheads

Brooklyn Royal Giants players
New York Black Yankees players
Year of birth missing
Year of death missing
Baseball third basemen